"Are We Ourselves?" is a 1984 song by English new wave band the Fixx, the first single from their third album, Phantoms.  Written by the band's five members, it was the Fixx's third of four top 20 US hits, the others being "Saved By Zero","One Thing Leads to Another" and "Secret Separation".

Description 
In an interview, the band stated that the song is about taking on a new persona when going somewhere in which one is unfamiliar.

Chart performance 
"Are We Ourselves?" debuted on the Billboard Hot 100 on the issue dated August 18, 1984, reaching #15 on the issue dated October 20 of the same year and spending a total of 15 weeks on the chart.  It also reached #1 on the Mainstream Rock chart, where it spent a total of two weeks at that position.

References 

1984 songs
1984 singles
The Fixx songs